The Kerala Fire and Rescue Services is the service department of the Government of Kerala whose function is to fight fires and provide relief measures in times of calamities and disasters in Kerala. It is responsible for the provision of fire protection as well as responding to building collapses, drownings, gas leakage, oil spillage, road and rail accidents, bird and animal rescues, fallen trees and taking appropriate action during natural disasters. The department has now 129 Fire and Rescue stations , a Training Academy and  An Institute of Advanced Water Rescue Training Centre
 consisting of nearly 4800 executive personnel and nearly 200 ministerial staff. The Headquarters the department is situated at Thiruvananthapuram. "WE SERVE TO SAVE" is the motto of the department.

History
There were separate Fire services in Travancore, Cochin and Malabar States before the formation of Kerala State. There were three fire stations in Travancore and Kochi and five fire stations in Malabar. These stations were under the control of Police Department. In 1949, the Fire Station of Travancore and Cochin states were joined together. In 1956, Malabar state was also included and thus the Kerala Fire Service came into being. From then onwards, the Inspector General of Police was the head of the Fire Service up to 1963. Fire services worked as part of the Police Department. As per the notification of The Kerala Government in 1962, Kerala Fire Force Act came into existence.

The Kerala Fire Force department started working as a separate department since 1963. Director of Civil Defence held the position of the Head of the Department till 1967. From 1967 to August 1970 an Inspector General of Police held the charge of the Director for Fire Force. In 1970 the Fire Force Department was brought under a separate Director. In 1982 the name of the Director of Fire Force was renamed as Commandant General, Home Guards, Civil Defence and Fire Force. Considering the rescue works under taken by this Department and significance in that area, this department had been renamed as Kerala Fire & Rescue Services in 2002. Now the Department is rendering its remarkable and commendable service through 129 Fire & Rescue Stations. In 2015 the name of the Commandant General was renamed as Director General, Fire and Rescue, Home Guards and Civil Defence. There are 14 District Offices and 6 Regional Offices in Thiruvananthapuram, Kottayam, Ernakulam, Palakkad Kozhikode and Kannur and one RegionalFire Officer in the post of Director and three district Fire Officers in the post of Assistant Director in Kerala Fire and Rescue Services Academy. Motor Transport wing is established in Headquarters, Academy and six Regional offices. The Department is in a stage of modernisation and development so as to provide better service to the public in all emergency situations.

Organisation structure
The head of the Department is the Director General (D.G.) who is the rank of the D.G.P., I.P.S. rank and under him there is a Director (Technical) and Director (Administration) at the Headquarters. There are six Regional Offices consisting of two or three districts, located in Thiruvananthapuram, Kottayam, Ernakulam, Palakkad, Kozhikode and Kannur where Regional Officers are in charge. Each district has a District Fire Office and under each District Fire Officer there are Fire & Rescue Stations where a Station Officer as the station in charge.

At each station, in addition to Station Officer there are Assistant Station Officers, Senior Fire and Rescue Officer,Senior Fire and Rescue Officer (Mechanic),Fire and Rescue Officer, Fire and Rescue Officer (Driver). In addition to this, there is a full-fledged ministerial staff at Headquarters, Regional offices, viyyur Academy and District Offices.

Services
 Rescue services
 Pumping services
 Ambulance services
 Awareness programs
 Security Checkup
 Training programs
 Mock drills

Selection and training

Recruitment of personnel is based on statewide. The Kerala Public Service Commission is undertaking the recruitment procedure. Recruitment procedure includes written examination, physical test and medical test. Those who has selected has to undergo a training as specified.
For imparting training to the employees and newly recruited Fireman, Fireman Driver cum Pump Operator and Driver Mechanic, Fire And Rescue Services Academy was started at Viyyur, Thrissur in 2007. The supervision of this Academy is held by the Director in the rank of Regional Fire Officer. Three District Fire Officers and Station Officer who have the charge of the training are also working in this Academy.

See also
Kerala Fire and Rescue Services Academy

Gallery

References

Organisations based in Thiruvananthapuram
1963 establishments in Kerala
Law enforcement in Kerala
Fire departments of India
State agencies of Kerala
Government agencies established in 1963